Remigijus Vilkaitis (born 1950) is a Lithuanian actor and former Minister of Culture of Lithuania.

Since 1975 he has worked at the Vilnius State Youth Theatre. He has participated in performances in US, Australia, Colombia and many European countries. He has conducted and played in more than 10 TV programs and performances and has produced theatre and radio plays. Vilkaitis is also author of two fiction books.

From 2008-2010 Vilkaitis was elected as Lithuania's Minister of Culture.

References

20th-century Lithuanian male actors
Ministers of Culture of Lithuania
Living people
1950 births
Lithuanian male stage actors
Lithuanian male television actors
Date of birth missing (living people)